Hans Hanssen Skei (born 20 August 1945) is a Norwegian editor and writer.

He was born in Dønna, and graduated as Ph.D. with the treatise "The novelist as short story writer : a study of William Faulkner's short stories with special emphasis on the period 1928-1932" at the University of Oslo. He has been the editor-in-chief of Nordisk Tidskrift since 2002. Skei has provided a large amount of literary criticism on the works of William Faulkner, and has also translated some of his books.

He is a member of the Norwegian Academy of Science and Letters.

Selected works

References

External links
Profile at UiO

1945 births
Living people
Norwegian encyclopedists
Members of the Norwegian Academy of Science and Letters
People from Dønna